Major-General David Boyd Alexander-Sinclair  (2 May 1927 – 7 February 2014) was a British Army officer who commanded 1st Division.

Military career
Educated at Eton College, Alexander-Sinclair was commissioned into the Rifle Brigade (The Prince Consort's Own) in 1946. In 1967 he was given command of 3rd Bn Royal Green Jackets. He was appointed Commander of 6th Armoured Brigade in 1971, General Officer Commanding 1st Division in 1975 and Chief of Staff at UK Land Forces in 1978. His last role was as Commandant of the Staff College, Camberley in 1980 before he retired in 1982. He died on 7 February 2014.

Family
In 1958 he married Ann Ruth Daglish; they had two sons and one daughter.

References

|-

1927 births
2014 deaths
British Army major generals
Rifle Brigade officers
Companions of the Order of the Bath
People educated at Eton College
Commandants of the Staff College, Camberley